Windsor Station is a former railway station in Montreal, Quebec, Canada. It used to be the city's Canadian Pacific Railway (CPR) station, and served as the headquarters of CPR from 1889 to 1996. It is bordered by Avenue des Canadiens-de-Montréal to the north, Peel Street to the east, Saint Antoine Street to the south and the Bell Centre to the west.

Windsor Station was designated a National Historic Site of Canada in 1975, and was designated a Heritage Railway Station in 1990, and a provincial historic monument in 2009.

The walls are gray limestone from a quarry in Montreal.

History

In 1887, the Canadian Pacific Railway (CPR) began to build a railway station in Montreal, which would serve as its headquarters, three years after the completion of the Dalhousie Station in 1884. The Windsor Station project was entrusted to New York City architect Bruce Price, who chose a Romanesque Revival style for the building. Price had to submit four versions of his plans to satisfy the treasurer of CPR, before the project was accepted. It was constructed at a cost of $300,000 CAD,  and the first trains departed February 4, 1889. It was known as the Windsor Street Station, named for the street on which it was located, Windsor Street (today Peel Street).

It was expanded for the first time from 1900 to 1903, and again from 1910 to 1913 by Canadian architects. The third expansion, in 1916, included a fifteen-storey tower which dramatically altered Montreal's skyline. The project was entrusted to the firm of brothers Edward and William Maxwell.

Windsor Station formed an integral component of Dominion Square as a diffuser of passenger traffic and as a central terminus for other modes of transportation. The building skirted Windsor Street (today Peel Street) and Osborne Street (today Avenue des Canadiens-de-Montréal) between Donegani (located halfway between Osborne Street and Saint Antoine Street). The building had four floors up to Osborne Street and five floors at street-level on Donegani Street because of the slope of the terrain.

In July 1970, CPR announced its plans to demolish Windsor Station and build a 60-storey office building on the site. The building, which was going to cost C$250 million, was to be designed by the same architects as New York City's World Trade Center. After several delays the project was abandoned.

Via Rail was created in 1978 and took over the responsibility for operating intercity passenger trains of both Canadian National CN and CPR. During Via's first months there was no operational change for CPR or CN trains, as they used their respective crews, routes, equipment and stations. However, by the summer of 1979, the integration process began, and most of Via's former CP trains that used Windsor Station were consolidated at CN's Central Station, including CP's former transcontinental passenger services such as The Atlantic Limited and The Canadian, both of which were also renamed to be bilingually appropriate. Via Dayliners (Budd Rail Diesel Cars) operating between Windsor Station and St. Sacrement station in Quebec City via the CP route north of the St. Lawrence River continued to use Windsor Station until 1984. Amtrak's daily Montreal-New York City train (the Adirondack) continued to use Windsor Station until 1986. Both the dayliners and the Adirondack were switched to Central Station. Local services to Ottawa via Montebello and to Mont-Laurier, both of which had been transferred from CPR to Via, continued to use Windsor Station until they were cancelled in 1981.

After intercity passenger service was removed, Windsor Station continued to be a commuter rail terminal for the STCUM's (now the RTM's) Montréal/Dorion-Rigaud suburban train (now Vaudreuil-Hudson line). In 1999, service to Blainville (now Saint-Jérôme line) was added, and in 2001, service to Delson (now Candiac line).

In 1993, construction began on the Molson Centre (now Bell Centre), a hockey arena to replace the Montreal Forum. The arena site was located immediately west of Windsor Station on the trackage which served the station platforms, resulting in the historic station being severed from the rail network. The Molson Centre opened its doors on March 16, 1996, and the new Lucien-L'Allier Station was opened at the western end of the arena structure to replace the now-closed suburban train terminal at Windsor Station. Until 2001, the new train station was called Terminus Windsor, but this was changed to reduce confusion with the original station building and to indicate a link to the Lucien-L'Allier metro (subway) station which is below the station building. It is still possible to walk through the Bell Centre to connect with Windsor Station and the Lucien L'Allier metro station.

Windsor Station, and now Lucien-L'Allier Station (known in French as 'Terminus Lucien-L'Allier'), are at the eastern end of CPR's Westmount Subdivision. It served as CP's downtown west end train terminus. Its counterpart downtown east end terminus was Place Viger.

Windsor Station also housed the headquarters of CPR and its parent company Canadian Pacific Limited until, after a corporate restructuring in the mid-1990s, the railway abandoned or sold most of its trackage east of Montreal and focused its activities in Western Canada. In 1996, CP moved its headquarters to Gulf Canada Square in Calgary.

Today

Since 1993, the structure is no longer connected to the rail network. It was sold by CP to Cadillac Fairview in 2009 (thus removing it from the jurisdiction of the Heritage Railway Stations Act; consequently, it was classified as a provincial heritage site that same year).

Also located in the station is the Canadian Railway Office of Arbitration.

The rest of Windsor Station has been redeveloped into an office complex and houses some restaurants and cafés. The interior concourse, which is open to the public, can be rented for private and public events. The lower floor is part of the RÉSO and connects the Bonaventure metro station with the Lucien-L'Allier commuter rail station as well as the Bell Centre. The 13 terminal tracks running into Windsor Station and the overhead canopy have been removed, and replaced by a public square.

See also 
 Angel of Victory, a statue in the station
 Drury's
 The Adirondack, The last intercity train to use this station

References

External links

 
 Cadillac Fairview | Property: Gare Windsor (official website)

Canadian Pacific Railway stations in Quebec
Railway stations in Montreal
Railway stations in Canada opened in 1889
Designated Heritage Railway Stations in Quebec
Landmarks in Montreal
Disused railway stations in Canada
Romanesque Revival architecture in Canada
National Historic Sites in Quebec
Heritage buildings of Quebec
Railway stations closed in 1993
Downtown Montreal
Richardsonian Romanesque architecture in Canada
Former New York Central Railroad stations
Former Amtrak stations in Canada
Cadillac Fairview
Bruce Price buildings
Former Delaware and Hudson Railway stations